Ranko Radović (August 18, 1935 – February 16, 2005) was a Montenegrin and Yugoslav architect, professor and theoretician of architecture. He taught contemporary architecture and urbanism at the University of Belgrade Faculty of Architecture between 1972 and 1992. In 1996 he founded the Novi Sad School of Architecture, a division within the University of Novi Sad.

Ranko Radović was the president of the International Federation for Housing and Planning between 1984 and 1992.

While Radović was never interested in politics, in January 2003 he was elected into the government of Montenegro to a post of Minister of Ecology and Urbanism. In this capacity he was noted of originality. For example, his official ministerial vehicle was a bicycle. When he resigned from the post in September 2003, he donated his "official bicycle" to the best student of an elementary school in Podgorica.

The Ranko Radović Award, for promotion of critical theoretical thought and creativity in the field of architecture, is presented annually by "The Applied Artists and Designers Association of Serbia" (ULUPUDS).

Books
 О архитектури, Клуб Младих Архитеката, Београд, 1971.
 Физичка структура града, ИАУС, Београд, 1972.
 Градски центри, Архитектонски факултет, Београд, 1976.
 Живи простор, Независна издања Слободана Машића, Београд, 1979.
 Форма града, STYLOS, Novi Sad, 2003 / Orion art, Београд, 2003 / Грађевинска књига, Београд, 2009.
 Антологија кућа, Грађевинска књига, Београд, 1985,1988,1989,1991.
 Нова антологија кућа, Грађевинска књига, Београд, 2007.
 Савремена архитектура, STYLOS, Нови Сад, 1998,2001. 
 Врт или кавез, Прометеј, Нови Сад, 1995.
 Нови врт и стари кавез, STYLOS, Нови Сад, 2005.

Awards
1997: Lifetime achievement award from the Association of Applied Arts Artists and Designers of Serbia (УЛУПУДС)
1997:

References

1935 births
2005 deaths
20th-century Serbian architects
Serbian architects
Academic staff of the University of Novi Sad
Academic staff of the University of Belgrade
People from Podgorica
Serbian people of Montenegrin descent
Brutalist architects
Postmodern architects
Serbian educators
Yugoslav architects